Henri Pujol is a French professor at University of Montpellier 1 and former president of the French ligue against cancer from 1998 to 2007.

Bibliography 
 L'Assiette Vitalité

Notes 

Year of birth missing (living people)
Living people
Academic staff of the University of Montpellier
Place of birth missing (living people)